Escondido Summit, elevation , is a mountain pass in northern Los Angeles County, California.

Nearby Formations
Soledad Pass - a second, lower mountain pass located at the highest point within Soledad Canyon.
Soledad Canyon
Vazquez Rocks

References

Mountain passes of California
Sierra Pelona Ridge
Transportation in Los Angeles County, California